"Tragedy In A Temporary Town" is a 1959 episode of the Australian anthology drama show Shell Presents starring Michael Pate. It was filmed "live" in Melbourne, then recorded and broadcast in Sydney. It was the third episode of Shell Presents and the first shot in Melbourne.

The script had originally been filmed under the same title on The Alcoa Hour in the US in 1956.

Plot
In a small town, a group of migrant workers are employed at an aircraft factory and live in a trailer park. When a girl claims she has been attacked, a group of men, led by Frank Doran, attempt to find out who is possible. They seize a Mexican boy, Raphael Infante, and threaten to lynch him.  A tolerant man called Alec Beggs attempts to stop them.

Cast
Michael Pate as Alec Beggs
George Fairfax as Frank Doran
Paul Karo as Raphael Infante
Marjorie Archibald as Mrs. Fisher
Carol Armstrong as Dotty Fisher
Susan Armstrong as Inez Infanti
John Cousins as Repulski
Marcel Cugola as Julio Infante, Raphael's father
Earl Francis as Mickey Doran
John Garry as Muller
Frank Gatliff as Matt Fisher, the parent of the teenage girl
Tim Goodlett as Anderson
Alan Hopgood as McCarthy
Edward Howell as Harry Phillips
Bettine Kauffmann as Dolores Infante

Production
The production starred Australian Michael Pate who was based in Hollywood from 1950 until the late 1960s. He made the film on a temporary return visit to Australia, arriving in Melbourne in late April to begin rehearsals.

The play was shot in Melbourne.

Reception
The TV critic for The Age called it "promising" with an "outstanding performance" from George Fairfax.

The TV critic for the Woman's Weekly called the production "a tragedy all right...  the play was notably unrealistic, its star, Michael Pate, disappointing... a brave and expensive experiment for a commercial channel... [but] miserable viewing."

The TV critic for the Sydney Morning Herald said it "did not make its potential impact because of uninventive direction and, with the tension factor suffering accordingly, some lack of subtlety in the characterisations."

See also
 The 1956 original presentation of Tragedy in a Temporary Town.
 List of television plays broadcast on ATN-7

References

External links
 

1959 Australian television episodes
Shell Presents
1950s Australian television plays
1959 television plays